Pedram Hamrah is a German-American ophthalmologist and immunologist. He obtained his M.D. from the University of Cologne, Germany. In 2002, together with Reza Dana and Ying Liu, he was the first to discover the presence of and characterize resident antigen-presenting cells in the central cornea. Hamrah is currently Director of the Center for Translational Ocular Immunology and Director of Anterior Segment Imaging of the Boston Image Reading Center at the New England Eye Center, Department of Ophthalmology Tufts Medical Center, Tufts University School of Medicine. In addition he is on the faculty of the Programs of Immunology and Neuroscience at the School of Graduate Biomedical Sciences at Tufts University. He was a faculty member in the laboratory of Ulrich von Andrian at Harvard's Immune Disease Institute from 2008 to 2012.

Selected works
Hamrah, Pedram, Ying Liu, Qiang Zhang, and M. Reza Dana. "The corneal stroma is endowed with a significant number of resident dendritic cells." Investigative Ophthalmology & Visual Science 44, no. 2 (2003): 581-589.
Hamrah, Pedram, Qiang Zhang, Ying Liu, and M. Reza Dana. "Novel characterization of MHC class II–negative population of resident corneal Langerhans cell–type dendritic cells." Investigative Ophthalmology & Visual Science 43, no. 3 (2002): 639-646.
Hamrah, Pedram, Syed O. Huq, Ying Liu, Qiang Zhang, and M. Reza Dana. "Corneal immunity is mediated by heterogeneous population of antigen‐presenting cells." Journal of Leukocyte Biology 74, no. 2 (2003): 172-178.
Cursiefen, Claus, Lu Chen, Magali Saint-Geniez, Pedram Hamrah, Yiping Jin, Saadia Rashid, Bronislaw Pytowski et al. "Nonvascular VEGF receptor 3 expression by corneal epithelium maintains avascularity and vision." Proceedings of the National Academy of Sciences 103, no. 30 (2006): 11405-11410.
Chen, Lu, Pedram Hamrah, Claus Cursiefen, Qiang Zhang, Bronislaw Pytowski, J. Wayne Streilein, and M. Reza Dana. "Vascular endothelial growth factor receptor-3 mediates induction of corneal alloimmunity." Nature Medicine 10, no. 8 (2004): 813-815.

References

American ophthalmologists
Harvard Medical School faculty
Living people
Year of birth missing (living people)